The 1870–71 United States House of Representatives elections were held on various dates in various states between June 6, 1870 and October 6, 1871. Each state set its own date for its elections to the House of Representatives before or after the first session of the 42nd United States Congress convened on March 4, 1871. They occurred in the middle of President Ulysses S. Grant's first term. Elections were held for all 243 seats, representing 37 states.

With Grant's administration rocked by a number of scandals (including a shady deal for gold speculation that led to a crash in the market and several business deals that saw high-ranking governmental officials gain kickbacks) and Reconstruction winding down, his Republican Party lost seats to the opposition Democratic Party but retained an overall majority. Also, since white-supremacist governments controlled by the Democratic Party were reestablishing themselves in some portions of the South, the Democrats were able to make huge gains in this election.

Election summaries

The previous election included 5 Conservatives

Election dates

In 1845, Congress passed a law providing for a uniform nationwide date for choosing Presidential electors. This law did not affect election dates for Congress, which remained within the jurisdiction of State governments, but over time, the States moved their congressional elections to this date as well. In 1870, there remained 12 States that held elections before Election Day, and 4 that held it after at this time:

 Early elections:
 December 1, 1869: Mississippi (Mississippi was a special case, having held elections for both the 41st Congress upon readmission and for the 42nd Congress on the same day)
 June 6: Oregon
 August 4: North Carolina
 September 6: Vermont
 September 12: Maine
 October 11: Indiana, Iowa, Nebraska, Ohio, Pennsylvania
 October 25: West Virginia
 November 1: South Carolina
 Late elections:
 March 14, 1871: New Hampshire
 April 4, 1871: Connecticut
 August 6, 1871: Montana Territory
 September 6, 1871: California
 October 6, 1871: Texas

Special elections 

|-
! 
|-
! 
|-
! 
|-
! 
| Benjamin F. Hopkins
|  | Republican
| 1866
|  | Incumbent died January 1, 1870.New member elected February 15, 1870.Republican hold.
| nowrap | 

|}

Alabama

Arizona Territory 
See Non-voting delegates, below.

Arkansas

California 

|-
! 
| Samuel Beach Axtell
|  | Democratic
| 1867
|  | Incumbent retired.New member elected.Republican Gain.
| nowrap | 
|-
! 
| Aaron Sargent
|  | Republican
| 1868
| Incumbent re-elected.
| nowrap | 
|-
! 
| James A. Johnson
|  | Democratic
| 1867
|  | Incumbent retired.New member elected.Republican Gain.
| nowrap | 

|}

Colorado Territory 
See Non-voting delegates, below.

Connecticut

Dakota Territory 
See Non-voting delegates, below.

Delaware

District of Columbia 
See Non-voting delegates, below.

Florida 

|-
! 
| Charles M. Hamilton
|  | Republican
| 1868
|  | Incumbent retired.New member elected.Republican hold.
| nowrap | 

|}

Niblack subsequently successfully challenged Walls's election and was seated from Florida's at-large district on January 29, 1873.

Georgia

Idaho Territory 
See Non-voting delegates, below.

Illinois

Indiana

Iowa

Kansas

Kentucky

Louisiana

Maine

Maryland

Massachusetts

Michigan

Minnesota

Missouri

Montana Territory 
See Non-voting delegates, below.

Nebraska 

|-
! 
| John Taffe
|  | Republican
| 1866
| Incumbent re-elected.
| nowrap | 

|}

Nevada

New Hampshire

New Jersey

New York

North Carolina

New Mexico Territory 
See Non-voting delegates, below.

Ohio 

|-
! 
| Peter W. Strader
|  | Democratic
| 1868
|  | Incumbent retired.New member elected.Republican gain.
| nowrap | 
|-
! 
| Job E. Stevenson
|  | Republican
| 1868
| Incumbent re-elected.
| nowrap | 
|-
! 
| Robert C. Schenck
|  | Republican
| 1862
|  | Incumbent lost re-election.New member elected.Democratic gain.
| nowrap | 
|-
! 
| William Lawrence
|  | Republican
| 1864
|  | Incumbent retired.New member elected.Democratic gain.
| nowrap | 
|-
! 
| William Mungen
|  | Democratic
| 1866
|  | Incumbent retired.New member elected.Democratic hold.
| nowrap | 
|-
! 
| John Armstrong Smith
|  | Republican
| 1868
| Incumbent re-elected.
| nowrap | 
|-
! 
| James J. Winans
|  | Republican
| 1868
|  | Incumbent lost renomination.New member elected.Republican hold.
| nowrap | 
|-
! 
| John Beatty
|  | Republican
| 1868 
| Incumbent re-elected.
| nowrap | 
|-
! 
| Edward F. Dickinson
|  | Democratic
| 1868
|  | Incumbent lost re-election.New member elected.Republican gain.
| nowrap | 
|-
! 
| Erasmus D. Peck
|  | Republican
| 1870 
| Incumbent re-elected.
| nowrap | 
|-
! 
| John Thomas Wilson
|  | Republican
| 1866
| Incumbent re-elected.
| nowrap | 
|-
! 
| Philadelph Van Trump
|  | Democratic
| 1866
| Incumbent re-elected.
| nowrap | 
|-
! 
| George W. Morgan
|  | Democratic
| 1868
| Incumbent re-elected.
| nowrap | 
|-
! 
| Martin Welker
|  | Republican
| 1864
|  | Incumbent retired.New member elected.Republican hold.
| nowrap | 
|-
! 
| Eliakim H. Moore
|  | Republican
| 1868
|  | Incumbent retired.New member elected.Republican hold.
| nowrap | 
|-
! 
| John Bingham
|  | Republican
| 1864
| Incumbent re-elected.
| nowrap | 
|-
! 
| Jacob A. Ambler
|  | Republican
| 1868
| Incumbent re-elected.
| nowrap | 
|-
! 
| William H. Upson
|  | Republican
| 1868
| Incumbent re-elected.
| nowrap | 
|-
! 
| James A. Garfield
|  | Republican
| 1862
| Incumbent re-elected.
| nowrap | 

|}

Oregon

Pennsylvania

Rhode Island

South Carolina

Tennessee 

|-
! 
| Roderick R. Butler
|  | Republican
| 1867
| Incumbent re-elected.
| nowrap | 
|-
! 
| Horace Maynard
|  | Republican
| 1865
| Incumbent re-elected.
| nowrap | 
|-
! 
| William B. Stokes
|  | Republican
| 1865
|  |Incumbent lost re-election.New member elected.Democratic gain.
| nowrap | 
|-
! 
| Lewis Tillman
|  | Republican
| 1868
|  |Incumbent retired.New member elected.Democratic gain.
|  nowrap | 
|-
! 
| William F. Prosser
|  | Republican
| 1868
|  |Incumbent lost re-election.New member elected.Democratic gain.
| nowrap | 
|-
! 
| Samuel M. Arnell
|  | Republican
| 1865
|  |Incumbent retired.New member elected.Democratic gain.
|  
|-
! 
| Isaac R. Hawkins
|  | Republican
| 1865
|  |Incumbent retired.New member elected.Democratic gain.
| nowrap | 
|-
! 
| William J. Smith
|  | Republican
| 1868
|  |Incumbent lost re-election.New member elected.Democratic gain.
| nowrap | 

|}

Texas

Utah Territory 
See Non-voting delegates, below.

Vermont

Virginia

Washington Territory 
See Non-voting delegates, below.

West Virginia 

|-
! 
| Isaac H. Duval
|  | Republican
| 1868
|  | Incumbent retired.New member elected.Democratic gain.
| nowrap | 
|-
! 
| James McGrew
|  | Republican
| 1868
| Incumbent re-elected.
| nowrap | 
|-
! 
| John Witcher
|  | Republican
| 1868
|  | Incumbent lost re-election.New member elected.Democratic gain.
| nowrap | 

|}

Wisconsin

Wisconsin elected six members of congress on Election Day, November 8, 1870.

|-
! 
| Halbert E. Paine
|  | Republican
| 1864
|  | Incumbent retired.New member elected.Democratic gain.
| nowrap | 
|-
! 
| David Atwood
|  | Republican
| 1870 
|  | Incumbent retired.New member elected.Republican hold.
| nowrap | 
|-
! 
| Amasa Cobb
|  | Republican
| 1862
|  | Incumbent retired.New member elected.Republican hold.
| nowrap | 
|-
! 
| Charles A. Eldredge
|  | Democratic
| 1862
| Incumbent re-elected.
| nowrap | 
|-
! 
| Philetus Sawyer
|  | Republican
| 1864
| Incumbent re-elected.
| nowrap | 
|-
! 
| Cadwallader C. Washburn
|  | Republican
| 1866
|  | Incumbent retired.New member elected.Republican hold.
| nowrap | 

|}

Wyoming Territory 
See Non-voting delegates, below.

Non-voting delegates 

|-
! 
| Richard C. McCormick
|  | Republican
| 1869
| Incumbent re-elected.
| nowrap | 
|-
! 
| Allen A. Bradford
|  | Republican
| 1868
|  | Unknown if incumbent retired or lost renomination.New delegate elected.Republican hold.
| nowrap | 
|-
! 
| Solomon L. Spink
|  | Republican
| 1868
|  | Incumbent lost re-election as a Democrat.New delegate elected.Independent Democratic gain.
| nowrap | 
|-
! 
| colspan=3 | New district
|  | New seat.New delegate elected in 1871.Republican gain.
| nowrap | 
|-
! 
| Jacob K. Shafer
|  | Democratic
| 1868
|  | Incumbent lost renomination.New member elected.Democratic hold.
|nowrap | 
|-
! 
| James M. Cavanaugh
|  | Democratic
| 1859 1861 1868
|  | Incumbent lost renomination.New delegate elected delegate August 7, 1871.Republican hold.
| nowrap | 
|-
! 
| José F. Chaves
|  | Republican
| 1868
|  | Incumbent lost re-election.New member elected.Democratic gain.
| nowrap | 
|-
! 
| William H. Hooper
|  | Democratic
| 1864
| Incumbent re-elected.
| nowrap | 
|-
! 
| Selucius Garfielde
|  | Republican
| 1868
| Incumbent re-elected June 6, 1870.
| nowrap | 
|-
! 
| Stephen F. Nuckolls
|  | Democratic
| 1869
|  | Incumbent retired.New member elected.Republican gain.
| nowrap | 

|}

See also
 1870 United States elections
 1870–71 United States Senate elections
 41st United States Congress
 42nd United States Congress

Notes

References

Bibliography

External links
 Office of the Historian (Office of Art & Archives, Office of the Clerk, U.S. House of Representatives)